The 10th anniversary celebrations of founding of the People's Republic of China were held on 1 October 1959. The main event was held in Tiananmen Square in Beijing. A grand banquet with many international dignitaries had been organized on the preceding evening.

Constructions
In Beijing, ten "great buildings" were constructed ahead of the celebrations. The most prominent of the ten was the Great Hall of the People.

In Beijing

28–29 September celebratory meeting
On 28 and 29 September 1959 a meeting of more than 10,000 people was held in the Great Hall of the People. Chairman Mao Zedong and President Liu Shaoqi were present at the dias. President Liu Shaoqi held a keynote speech at the meeting. Prominent international guests at the event included Ho Chi Minh, Mikhail Suslov, Emil Bodnăraș, Hermann Matern, Mehmet Shehu, Dimitar Ganev, István Dobi, Aleksander Zawadzki, Yumjaagiin Tsedenbal, Kim Il-sung and Antonín Novotný.

30 September banquet
On the evening of 30 September 1959, a jubilee banquet was hosted in the Great Hall of the People. Around 5,000 people attended the banquet, including guests from around 80 countries. Mao Zedong and Soviet Premier Nikita Khrushchev entered the hall together, meeting applause. Chinese Premier Zhou Enlai and Soviet Premier Khrushchev presented their greetings at the banquet. The Soviet Foreign Minister Andrei Gromyko also participated in the banquet.

Khrushchev had arrived directly from a visit to the United States on the same day. He held a short speech upon his arrival at the airport.

1 October Tiananmen Square parade
According to Chinese media, the Tiananmen Square event gathered 700,000 people. At Tiananmen Square participants formed a human version of the national emblem of the People's Republic with the numerals '1949' and '1959' on the sides. A band of one thousand musicians with brass instruments and olive-green uniforms opened the event, playing The East is Red at 09.45. At this point Mao Zedong and Nikita Khrushchev entered the dias. Other dignitaries on the dias included Liu Shaoqi, Soong Ching-ling, Lin Biao, Zhu De, Dong Biwu, Deng Xiaoping and various international guests.

The mayor of Peking, Peng Zhen, declared the ceremony open at 10.00. The national anthem was played and a delegation of 400 Young Pioneers presented a floral tribute at the People's Heroes Monument.

After a speech by Defense Minister Lin Biao, a military parade began, followed by a parade of workers, peasants, students and athletes.

International delegations at the main events in Peking
At the 30 September banquet, a number of international delegations assisted, representing communist and workers parties and governments. Names of head of delegation in brackets.

Socialist Bloc
There were eleven joint state-party delegations from the Socialist Bloc, representing;
 (Mehmet Shehu)
 (Dimitar Ganev)
 (Antonín Novotný)
 (Hermann Matern)
 (István Dobi)
 (Kim Il-sung)
 (Yumjaagiin Tsedenbal)
 (Aleksander Zawadzki)
 (Emil Bodnăraș)
 (Nikita Khrushchev)
 (Ho Chi Minh)

There were also military delegations present, from Vietnam (headed by Võ Nguyên Giáp) and North Korea (headed by Kim Kwang Hyup)

Africa
Algerian Communist Party (Larbi Bouhali)

Americas
Communist Party of Argentina (Victorio Codovilla)
Brazilian Communist Party (Luis Carlos Prestes)
Communist Party of Bolivia (Jesús Lara)
Labor-Progressive Party, Canada (Nelson Clarke)
Communist Party of Chile (José González)
Colombian Communist Party (Víctor J. Merchán)
People's Vanguard Party, Costa Rica (Arnoldo Ferreto)
Popular Socialist Party, Cuba (Anibal Escalante)
Communist Party of Ecuador (Alejandro Idrovo)
Guatemalan Party of Labour
Mexican Communist Party
Socialist Party of Nicaragua
Paraguayan Communist Party (Rogelio Espíndola)
Communist Party of Uruguay (Enrique Rodríguez)
Communist Party of Venezuela (Jesús Faría)

Asia and Pacific
Communist Party of Australia (Lance Sharkey)
Communist Party of Ceylon (K.P. de Silva)
Communist Party of India (Ajoy Ghosh)
Communist Party of Indonesia (Njoto)
Tudeh Party of Iran ('Tubali')
Iraqi Communist Party (Mohammed Hussein Abu al-Iss)
Israeli Communist Party (Tzvi Breitstein)
Japanese Communist Party (Sanzo Nosaka)
Jordanian Communist Party (Fu'ad Nassar)
Lebanese Communist Party (Hasan Qraytim)
Communist Party of Nepal (Keshar Jung Rayamjhi)
Communist Party of New Zealand (V. G. Wilcox)
Syrian Communist Party (Khaled Bakdash)

Europe
Communist Party of Austria (Johann Koplenig)
Communist Party of Belgium (Franz van den Branden)
Communist Party of Denmark (Robert Sartori)
Communist Party of Finland (Aimo Aaltonen)
French Communist Party (Waldeck Rochet)
Communist Party of Germany ('Karl')
Communist Party of Great Britain (Harry Pollitt)
Communist Party of Greece (Apostolos Grozos)
People's Unity Party – Socialist Party, Iceland (Eggert Þorbjarnarson)
Italian Communist Party (Girolamo Li Causi)
Communist Party of Luxembourg (Dominique Urbany)
Communist Party of the Netherlands (G. Pothoven)
Communist Party of Norway (Jørgen Vogt)
Portuguese Communist Party
Sammarinese Communist Party (Umberto Barulli)
Communist Party of Spain (Dolores Ibárruri)
Communist Party of Sweden (Hilding Hagberg)
Swiss Party of Labour (Guido Cavagna)
Communist Party of Turkey

Other state delegations
Official state delegations from non-socialist countries included;
Afghanistan (Ghulam Mohammed Sherzad, Minister of Commerce)
Algeria (Benyoucef Benkhedda, Minister of Social Welfare)
Burma (U Chit Thaung, Minister of Culture)
Guinea (Diawadou Barry, Minister of Education)
Iraq (Ahmad Muhammed Yahia, Minister for Internal Affairs)
Nepal (Dr. Tulsi Giri, Minister for Village Development)
Sudan (A. M. Gubara, Registrar of the University of Khartoum)
Yemen (Sayed Ali Al-Muyyad, Minister of State)

International organizations
World Federation of Trade Unions (Sugiri, secretariat member)
World Peace Council (John Desmond Bernal, executive president)
Women's International Democratic Federation (Marie-Claude Vaillant-Couturier, vice president)
World Federation of Democratic Youth (Christian Echard, general secretary)
Afro-Asian People's Solidarity Council (Youssef El-Sebai, general secretary)
International Union of Students (Jiří Pelikán, president)
International Association of Democratic Lawyers (Denis Nowell Pritt, president)

Daqing oil fields
On 26 September 1959, just a few days ahead of the anniversary, oil was discovered at Datongzhen. Datong Town and the oilfields were renamed 'Daqing' ('Great Celebration'), in reference to the tenth anniversary celebrations.

Other regions
Major parades were also organized in Shanghai, Chongqing, Guangzhou, Xian, Wuhan, Shenyang and Tianjin.

See also
 History of Beijing

References

External links

 1959 CHINA NATIONAL DAY 《庆祝建国十周年》

1959 in China
Military parades in China
Anniversaries